Bryan Adams is a Canadian singer-songwriter and guitarist. He has won 20 Juno Awards among 61 nominations, including wins for Best Male Artist in 2000 and Male Vocalist of the Year in 1997 and every year from 1983 to 1987. Adams has also had 16 Grammy Award nominations including a win for Best Song Written Specifically for a Motion Picture or Television for "(Everything I Do) I Do It for You" at the Grammy Awards in 1992.
Adams also won 36 Socan Awards, some of which were in collaboration with his friend and partner Jim Vallance.
Adams has also received awards and nominations at the American Music Awards, MTV Video Music Awards, and Golden Globe Awards.

In 1995, he collaborated with Sting and Rod Stewart for the single "All for Love", which received a Grammy nomination that same year.

Adams was appointed to the Order of Canada and the Order of British Columbia for his contribution to popular music and his philanthropic work. He was also inducted into Canada's Walk of Fame and Canadian Broadcast Hall of Fame in 1998.  In April 2006 he was inducted into the Music Hall of Fame at Canada's Juno Award, and in 2007 he was nominated for his fifth Golden Globe for the song "Never Gonna Break My Faith" which appeared on the soundtrack for the movie Bobby.
In 2018, Billboard ranked Adams at number 45 of the top-selling 100 artists in the US. In 2020 he won his 20th Juno Awards of his career, with the album Shine a Light, joining her compatriot Celine Dion.

Honours

Academy Awards
The Academy Awards, popularly known as the Oscars, are awards of merit presented annually by the Academy of Motion Picture Arts and Sciences (AMPAS) to recognize excellence of professionals in the film industry, including directors, actors, and writers. The formal ceremony at which the awards are presented is among the oldest, prestigious, and most watched film award ceremony in the world. Adams has been nominated three times but has never won.

|-
| 1992 || "(Everything I Do) I Do It for You" from Robin Hood: Prince of Thieves ||rowspan= "3"| Best Original Song || 
|-
| 1996 || "Have You Ever Really Loved a Woman?" from Don Juan DeMarco || 
|-
| 1997 || "I Finally Found Someone" from The Mirror Has Two Faces ||

American Music Awards
The American Music Awards  (AMA) are awarded for achievements in the record industry. Adams has won one AMA, and been nominated for three.

|-
|rowspan="2"|  || Bryan Adams || Favorite Pop/Rock Male Artist || 
|-
| "(Everything I Do) I Do It for You" || Favorite Pop/Rock Single || 
|-
|rowspan="1"|  || Bryan Adams || Favorite Pop/Rock Male Artist ||

APRA Music Awards
The APRA Awards in Australia are annual awards to celebrate excellence in contemporary music, which honour the skills of member composers, songwriters, and publishers who have achieved outstanding success in sales and airplay performance.

|-
|rowspan="1"| 1992 || "(Everything I Do) I Do It for You" ||Most Performed Foreign Work|| 
|-
|rowspan="1"| 1994 || "Please Forgive Me" ||Most Performed Foreign Work|| 
|-

ASCAP Film and Television Music Awards
The Ascap Award its leading members a series of annual awards, divided into nine categories: "Pop", "Rhythm and Soul", "Film and Television", "Latina", "Country", "Christian", "Rock", "Metal", "Rap", "Concert Music". In addition, ASCAP includes jazz musicians in its Jazz Wall of Fame with an annual ceremony held at the company's New York headquarters.

|-
|rowspan="1"| 1992 || "(Everything I Do) I Do It for You" ||Most Performed Songs from Motion Pictures|| 
|-
|rowspan="1"| 1995 || "All for Love" ||Most Performed Songs from Motion Pictures|| 
|-
|rowspan="1"| 1996 || "Have You Ever Really Loved a Woman?" ||Most Performed Songs from Motion Pictures|| 
|-
|rowspan="1"| 1998 || "I Finally Found Someone" ||Most Performed Songs from Motion Pictures|| 
|-
|rowspan="1"| 2003 || "Here I Am" ||Top Box Office Films|| 
|-

BMI Songwriter Awards

|-
|rowspan="3"| 1985 || "Heaven" ||Citation of Achievement for significant U.S. radio airplay|| 
|-
|"Summer of '69"||Citation of Achievement for significant U.S. radio airplay|| 
|-
|"Run to You"||Citation of Achievement for significant U.S. radio airplay|| 
|-
|rowspan="1"| 1986 || "When the Night Comes" ||Citation of Achievement for significant U.S. radio airplay||

Bravo Otto
Bravo Otto an award established in Germany in 1957 and awarded annually to personalities from the world of entertainment. Three prizes are awarded for each category: a "Bravo Otto d'oro", a "Bravo Otto silver" and a "Bravo Otto di bronze".

Canadian Screen Awards
The Canadian Screen Awards are awards annually awarded by the Academy of Canadian Cinema & Television, which recognize excellence in Canadian film, English-language television and digital media production.

|-
|rowspan="1"| 2018 || rowspan="1"| Bryan Adams ||Best Host in a Live Program or Series ||

Canadian Songwriters Hall of Fame

|-
| 2022
| Himself 
| Hall of Fame 
|

CMT Music Awards
In 2010 Adams received a CMT Music Awards nomination for his duet with Jason Aldean from CMT Crossroads.

|-
|rowspan="1"| 2010 || rowspan="1"| Bryan Adams&Jason Aldean || Collaborative Video of the Year – "Heaven" ||

Echo Music Prize
The Echo Music Prize (in German Echo Musikpreis) are prizes awarded since 1992 to the most important German and international artists by the Deutsche Phono-Akademie.

|-
|rowspan="1"| 1995 || rowspan="1"| Bryan Adams || Best International Rock/Pop Male Artist||

Golden Globe Awards
This category of the Hollywood Foreign Press Associations Golden Globe Awards recognizes soundtrack achievements. Adams has been nominated for five Golden Globes.

|-
|rowspan="1"| 1992 || "(Everything I Do) I Do It for You" || rowspan= "5"| Best Original Song - Motion Picture || 
|-
|rowspan="1"| 1996 || "Have You Ever Really Loved A Woman?" || 
|-
|rowspan="1"| 1997 || "I Finally Found Someone" || 
|-
|rowspan="1"| 2003 || "Here I Am" || 
|-
|rowspan="1"| 2007 || "Never Gonna Break My Faith" || 
|-

Goldene Kamera
The Goldene Kamera is a German television-film award that has been awarded annually by the television magazine HÖRZU since 1965, for non-fixed categories.

|-
|rowspan="1"| 2005 || rowspan="1"| Bryan Adams ||Best International Artist in der Kategorie||

GMA Dove Award
The GMA Dove Award is a musical award assigned by the Gospel Music Association (GMA) and dedicated to the sacred music sector.

|-
|rowspan="1"| 2017 || rowspan="1"| Bryan Adams ||Artist of the Year||

Grammy Awards
The Grammy Awards are awarded annually by the National Academy of Recording Arts and Sciences of the United States. Adams has won one Grammy and has been nominated for another 14. Also, in 1992, Michael Kamen won a Grammy Award for Best Pop Instrumental Performance for Robin Hood: Prince of Thieves, performing some of Adams' work, and Adams received an American Paper Institute Environmental Award for environmental packaging for Waking Up the Neighbours.

|-
|rowspan="2"| 1986 || Reckless || Best Rock Vocal Performance - Male || 
|-
| "It's Only Love" || Best Rock Vocal Performance by a Duo or Group || 
|-
|rowspan="6"| 1992 ||rowspan="4"| "(Everything I Do) I Do It for You" || Record of the Year || 
|-
| Song of the Year || 
|-
| Best Pop Vocal Performance - Male || 
|-
| Best Song Written for a Motion Picture, Television or Other Visual Media || 
|-
|rowspan="2"| "Can't Stop This Thing We Started" || Best Rock Solo Performance || 
|-
| Best Rock Song || 
|-
|rowspan="1"| 1993 ||rowspan="1"|"There Will Never Be Another Tonight" || Best Rock Vocal Performance - Male || 
|-
|rowspan="1"| 1995 ||rowspan="1"| "All for Love" || Best Pop Collaboration with Vocals || 
|-
|rowspan="2"| 1996 ||rowspan="2"| "Have You Ever Really Loved a Woman?" || Best Male Pop Vocal Performance || 
|-
| Best Song Written for a Motion Picture, Television or Other Visual Media || 
|-
|rowspan="2"| 1997 ||rowspan="1"| "Let's Make a Night to Remember" || Best Male Pop Vocal Performance || 
|-
|rowspan="1"| "The Only Thing That Looks Good on Me Is You" || Best Male Rock Vocal Performance || 
|-
|rowspan="1"| 1998 ||rowspan="1"| "I Finally Found Someone" || Best Pop Collaboration with Vocals || 
|-
|rowspan="1"| 2023 ||rowspan="1"| "So Happy It Hurts" || Best Rock Performance ||

Kerrang!
Kerrang!, list of album category charts of the year and all time.

Ivor Novello Awards

The Ivor Novello Awards are awarded for songwriting and composing. The awards, named after the Cardiff born entertainer Ivor Novello, are presented annually in London by the British Academy of Songwriters, Composers and Authors (BASCA).

 
|-
| 1992
| "(Everything I Do) I Do It for You"
| Award in Recognition of the Exception Success of a Single Song
|  
|-
| 1996
| "Have You Ever Really Loved a Woman?"
| Best Song Included in a Film or Television Programme
| 
|-
|2016
|Bryan Adams
|PRS for Music Special International Award
| 
|-

Juno Awards
The Juno Awards are presented annually to Canadian musical artists and bands to acknowledge their artistic and technical achievements in all aspects of music. Adams has won 18 awards out of 57 nominations.

|-
|rowspan="1"| 1980 ||rowspan="3"| Bryan Adams || Most Promising Male Vocalist of the Year || 
|-
|rowspan="1"| 1981 || Most Promising Male Vocalist of the Year || 
|-
|rowspan="1"| 1983 || Male Vocalist of the Year || 
|-
|rowspan="7"| 1984 || Cuts Like a Knife || Album of the Year || 
|-
| "Straight from the Heart" || Single of the Year || 
|-
| "Cuts Like a Knife" || Single of the Year || 
|-
| Bryan Adams || Male Vocalist of the Year || 
|-
| "Straight from the Heart" || Composer of the Year  || 
|-
| "Cuts Like a Knife" || Composer of the Year || 
|-
|rowspan="1"| Bryan Adams || Producer of the Year || 
|-
|rowspan="5"| 1985 || Reckless || Album of the Year || 
|-
|rowspan="1"| "Run to You" || Single of the Year  || 
|-
|rowspan="1"| Bryan Adams || Male Vocalist of the Year || 
|-
| Bryan Adams/Jim Vallance || Composer of the Year || 
|-
| Reckless || Producer of the Year || 
|-
|rowspan="3"| 1986 || "Diana || Single of the Year  || 
|-
|rowspan="2"| Bryan Adams || Male Vocalist of the Year || 
|-
| Composer of the Year  || 
|-
|rowspan="6"| 1987 ||rowspan="1"| "Heat of the Night" || Single of the Year || 
|-
|rowspan="2"| Bryan Adams || Male Vocalist of the Year || 
|-
| Composer of the Year || 
|-
| Bryan Adams (Co-producer Bob Clearmountain) || Producer of the Year || 
|-
| Into the Fire || Album of the Year  || 
|-
| Bryan Adams || Canadian Entertainer of the Year || 
|-
|rowspan="1"|1989 ||rowspan="1"| Bryan Adams || Canadian Entertainer of the Year || 
|-
|rowspan="8"|1992 || Waking Up the Neighbours || Album of the Year || 
|-
|rowspan="1"| Bryan Adams || Canadian Entertainer of the Year || 
|-
|rowspan="1"| "(Everything I Do) I Do It for You" || Single of the Year || 
|-
|rowspan="1"| "Can't Stop This Thing We Started" || Single of the Year || 
|-
| Bryan Adams || Male Vocalist of the Year || 
|-
| Bryan Adams || Songwriter of the Year || 
|-
| "Everything I Do (I Do It For You)"/"Can't Stop This Thing We Started" || Producer of the Year || 
|-
| Bryan Adams || International Achievement Award || 
|-
|rowspan="4"| 1993 ||rowspan="1"| Bryan Adams || Canadian Entertainer of the Year  || 
|-
|rowspan="1"| Waking Up the Neighbors || Best Selling Album (Foreign or Domestic) || 
|-
|rowspan="1"| "Thought I'd Died and Gone to Heaven" || Single of the Year  || 
|-
|rowspan="1"| Bryan Adams || Songwriter of the Year || 
|-
|rowspan="2"| 1995 || "Please Forgive Me" || Single of the Year || 
|-
| Bryan Adams || Songwriter of the Year || 
|-
|rowspan="4"| 1996 || Bryan Adams || Levi's Entertainer of the Year || 
|-
|rowspan="1"| "Have You Ever Really Loved a Woman?" || Single of the Year || 
|-
| Bryan Adams || Songwriter of the Year || 
|-
|rowspan="1"| "Have You Ever Really Loved a Woman?" || Producer of the Year || 
|-
|rowspan="4"| 1997 ||rowspan="1"| 18 til I Die || Album of the Year || 
|-
|rowspan="2"| Bryan Adams || Male Vocalist of the Year || 
|-
| Songwriter of the Year || 
|-
|rowspan="1"| "The Only Thing That Looks Good on Me is You"/"Let's Make A Night to Remember" || Producer of the Year || 
|-
|rowspan="2"| 1999 || Bryan Adams || Best Songwriter || 
|-
| "C'mon, C'mon, C'mon"/"How Do Ya Feel Tonight" || Best Producer || 
|-
|rowspan="3"| 2000 || On a Day Like Today || Best Album || 
|-
|rowspan="1"| Bryan Adams ||Best Male Artist || 
|-
| On a Day Like Today || Best Pop/Adult Album || 
|-
|rowspan="1"| 2001 ||rowspan="1"| "The Best of Me" || Best Songwriter || 
|-
|rowspan="2"| 2005 ||rowspan="1"| Bryan Adams || Artist of the Year || 
|-
|rowspan="1"| Room Service || CD/DVD Artwork Design of the Year || 
|-
|rowspan="1"| 2006 ||rowspan="1"| Bryan Adams || Canadian Music Hall of Fame || 
|-
|rowspan="1"| 2009 ||rowspan="1"| Bryan Adams || Artist of the Year || 
|-
|rowspan= "1"| 2016 ||rowspan="1"| Get Up || Rock Album of the Year || 
|-
|rowspan="3"| 2020 || Shine a Light || Album Of The Year|| 
|-
|rowspan="1"| Bryan Adams ||Best Male Artist || 
|-
| Shine a Light || Adult Contemporary Album Of The Year || 
|-

Lead Awards
The Lead Award is a German media award. The LeadAcademy für Medien e.V. annually awards the prize to the German press and online media.

|-
|rowspan="1"| 2006 || rowspan="3"| Bryan Adams || Porträtfotografie des Jahres || 
|-
|rowspan="1"| 2012 || Modefotografie des Jahres || 
|-
|rowspan="1"| 2015 || Porträtfotografie des Jahres ||

MTV Video Music Awards
The MTV Video Music Awards is an annual awards ceremony established in 1984 by MTV. Adams has been nominated eleven times and has received one award.

|-
|rowspan="5"|  ||rowspan="4"| "Run to You" || Best Art Direction || 
|-
| Best Cinematography || 
|-
| Best Editing || 
|-
| Best Visual Effects || 
|-
|rowspan="1"| "Heaven" ||Best Cinematography  || 
|-
|rowspan="2"|  ||rowspan="1"| "It's Only Love" || Best Stage Performance in a Video || 
|-
| "Summer of '69" || Best Male Video || 
|-
|rowspan="1"|  || "(Everything I Do) I Do It for You" ||Best Video from a Film || 
|-
|rowspan="1"|  || "Have You Ever Really Loved a Woman?" ||Best Video from a Film  || 
|-
|rowspan="1"|  || "The Only Thing That Looks Good on Me Is You" ||Best Male Video  ||

NME Awards

The NME Awards were created by the NME magazine and was first held in 1953. Adams has received one award from one nomination.

 
|-
| 1991
| "(Everything I Do) I Do It For You"
| Worst Single
|

Silver Clef Award
The Silver Clef Award is a prestigious award that has been awarded annually since 1976 to artists of the UK rock music scene who have distinguished themselves for their outstanding contribution to music.

|-
|rowspan="1"| 1995 || rowspan="1"| Bryan Adams ||International Award || 
|-
|rowspan="1"| 2008 || rowspan="1"| Bryan Adams ||Ambassadors of Rock Award||

SOCAN Awards
The SOCAN Awards is an annual event, held in both Toronto and Montréal, which celebrates the achievements of songwriters, composers and musical publications of Anglophone and Francophone members.
SOCAN is the result of a merger in 1990 between the Composers, Authors and Publishers Association of Canada (CAPAC) and the Performing Rights Organization of Canada (PROCAN).

|-
|rowspan= "1"| 1979 ||rowspan="1"|"Let Me Take You Dancing" || Canadian radio airplay || 
|-
|rowspan= "1"| 1982 ||rowspan="1"|"Coming Home" || Canadian radio airplay || 
|-
|rowspan= "2"| 1983 ||rowspan="1"|"Cuts Like a Knife" || Canadian radio airplay || 
|-
|rowspan="1"|"This Time"|| Canadian radio airplay || 
|-
|rowspan= "3"| 1984 ||rowspan="1"|"Run to You" || Canadian radio airplay || 
|-
|rowspan="1"|"Heaven" || Canadian radio airplay || 
|-
|rowspan="1"|"The Best Was Yet to Come" || Canadian radio airplay || 
|-
|rowspan= "4"| 1985 ||rowspan="1"|"Edge of a Dream" || Canadian radio airplay || 
|-
|rowspan="1"|"Summer of '69" || Canadian radio airplay || 
|-
|rowspan="1"|"Somebody" || Canadian radio airplay || 
|-
|rowspan="1"|"Tears Are Not Enough" || Canadian radio airplay || 
|-
|rowspan= "1"| 1992 ||rowspan="1"|"(Everything I Do) I Do It for You" || International Song || 
|-
|rowspan= "1"| 1993 ||rowspan="1"|"Do I Have to Say the Words?" || Pop/Rock Music || 
|-
|rowspan= "3"| 1995 ||rowspan="1"|"Straight from the Heart" || SOCAN Classics Award for over 100,000 airings in Canada || 
|-
|rowspan= "1"|"The Best Was Yet to Come" || SOCAN Classics Award for over 100,000 airings in Canada  ||   
|-
|rowspan= "1"|"Heaven" ||  SOCAN Classics Award for over 100,000 airings in Canada  || 
|-
|rowspan= "1"| 1996 ||rowspan="1"|"Have You Ever Really Loved a Woman?" ||  International Song  || 
|-
|rowspan= "1"| 1999 ||rowspan="1"|"I'm Ready" || Pop/Rock Music  || 
|-
|rowspan= "2"| 2000 ||rowspan="1"|"On a Day Like Today" || International Song  || 
|-
|rowspan= "1"|"Summer of '69"|| SOCAN Classics Award for over 100,000 airings in Canada  || 
|-
|rowspan= "2"| 2004 ||rowspan="1"|"Run to You" || SOCAN Classics Award for over 100,000 airings in Canada  || 
|-
|rowspan= "1"|"Somebody"|| SOCAN Classics Award for over 100,000 airings in Canada  ||  
|-
|rowspan= "4"| 2007 ||rowspan="1"|"I'm Ready"|| SOCAN Classics Award for over 100,000 airings in Canada  || 
|-
|rowspan= "1"|"It's Only Love"|| SOCAN Classics Award for over 100,000 airings in Canada  || 
|-
|rowspan= "1"|"This Time"|| SOCAN Classics Award for over 100,000 airings in Canada  || 
|-
|rowspan= "1"|"Cuts Like a Knife"|| SOCAN Classics Award for over 100,000 airings in Canada  || 
|-
|rowspan= "10"| 2017 ||rowspan="1"|"Have You Ever Really Loved a Woman?" ||SOCAN Classics Award for over 100,000 airings in Canada  || 
|-
|rowspan= "1"|"Edge of a Dream"|| SOCAN Classics Award for over 100,000 airings in Canada  || 
|-
|rowspan= "1"| "When You're Gone (Bryan Adams song)"|| SOCAN Classics Award for over 100,000 airings in Canada  || 
|-
|rowspan= "1"|"Lonely Nights"|| SOCAN Classics Award for over 100,000 airings in Canada  || 
|-
|rowspan= "1"|"(Everything I Do) I Do It for You"|| SOCAN Classics Award for over 100,000 airings in Canada  || 
|-
|rowspan= "1"|"Kids Wanna Rock"|| SOCAN Classics Award for over 100,000 airings in Canada  || 
|-
|rowspan= "1"|"Do I Have to Say the Words?"|| SOCAN Classics Award for over 100,000 airings in Canada  || 
|-
|rowspan= "1"|"Heat of the Night"|| SOCAN Classics Award for over 100,000 airings in Canada  || 
|-
|rowspan= "1"|"Teacher Teacher"|| SOCAN Classics Award for over 100,000 airings in Canada  || 
|-
|rowspan= "1"|Bryan Adams e Jim Vallance||Lifetime Achievement  ||

Songwriters Hall of Fame
The Songwriters Hall of Fame (SHOF) is a project of the National Academy of Popular Music (NAPM) which aims to create a museum dedicated to the most important songwriters of the US music industry.

|-
|rowspan="1"| 2017 || rowspan="1"| Bryan Adams ||Performing Songwriters|| 
|-
|rowspan="1"| 2023 || rowspan="1"| Bryan Adams ||Performing Songwriters ||

Other awards

|-
|rowspan="1"| 1984 || rowspan="48"| Bryan Adams ||Jack Richardson Producer of the Year Award || 
|-
|rowspan="2"| 1985 || William Harold Moon Award  (with Jim Vallance)  || 
|-
|Canadian Diamond Award (Reckless) || 
|-
|rowspan="1"| 1986 ||Bob Geldof Humanitarian Award  || 
|-
|rowspan="1"| 1987 ||PROCAN Crystal Award || 
|-
|rowspan="5"| 1991 ||List of Smash Hits Poll Winners Party|| 
|-
|Billboard Music Awards || 
|-
|Awards Circuit Community Awards || 
|-
|Rockbjörnen The year's foreign artist|| 
|-
|Rockbjörnen The year's foreign album|| 
|-
|rowspan="8"| 1992 ||MTV Movie Award for Best Musical Moment || 
|-
|Jack Richardson Producer of the Year Award || 
|-
|1992 MTV Movie Awards || 
|-
|Danish Music Awards || 
|-
|Brit Award for International Solo Artist || 
|-
|American Music Award for Favorite Pop/Rock Male Artist || 
|-
|American Music Award for Favorite Pop/Rock Song || 
|-
|Canadian Diamond Award (Waking Up the Neighbours) || 
|-
|rowspan="2"| 1993 ||World Music Award to the Canadian artist with the most sales in the world|| 
|-
|American Music Award for Favorite Pop/Rock Male Artist || 
|-
|rowspan="3"| 1994 ||MTV Europe Music Award for Best Male|| 
|-
|MTV Movie Award for Best Musical Moment || 
|-
|-
|1994 MTV Movie Awards || 
|-
|rowspan="2"| 1995 ||Brit Award for International Male Solo Artist  || 
|-
|American Music Award for Favorite Pop/Rock Male Artist || 
|-
|rowspan="4"| 1996 ||MTV Europe Music Award for Best Male|| 
|-
|Online Film & Television Association|| 
|-
|Favorite male classic rock || 
|-
|Favorite son for a movie  || 
|-
|rowspan="3"| 1997 ||Brit Award for International Male Solo Artist  || 
|-
|American Music Award for Favorite Pop/Rock Male Artist || 
|-
|Billboard Music Awards || 
|-
|rowspan="1"| 1998 ||Bambi Award|| 
|-
|rowspan="2"| 2002 ||World Soundtrack Awards|| 
|-
|World Soundtrack Awards|| 
|-
|rowspan="1"| 2003 ||Walk of Fame Europe|| 
|-
|rowspan="1"| 2006 ||Satellite Award|| 
|-
|rowspan="3"| 2007 ||Wembley Square of Fame|| 
|-
|Munich Olympic Walk of Stars|| 
|-
|Gold Derby Awards|| 
|-
|rowspan="1"| 2008 ||Emmy Award|| 
|-
|rowspan="1"| 2009 ||Goldene Feder || 
|-
|rowspan="1"| 2012 ||20/20 Awards|| 
|-
|rowspan="4"| 2015 ||Allan Slaight Humanitarian Spirit Award || 
|-
|Music Express Awards - (Best Male Vocalist)|| 
|-
|GQ Men of the Year|| 
|-
|Honorary Fellowship || 
|-

Recognition
In 2011, "Summer of '69" it ranked #1 in Ultimate Classic Rock's Top 10 Summer Songs. 
In 2018, "(Everything I Do) I Do It for You" it ranked #21 in All-time charts Top 100 songs of all time (1958–2018) di Billboard Hot 100.

See also
 List of best-selling music artists
 List of best-selling singles
 List of best-selling singles in the United States
 List of Billboard number-one singles
 List of artists who reached number one on the Hot 100 (US)
 List of artists who reached number one on the UK Singles Chart
 List of best-selling singles by year in the United Kingdom

References

External links

Bryan Adams homepage
The short film Bryan Adams: Bare Bones, created for Adams' 2010 Governor General's Award for Performing Arts presentation

Adams, Bryan
Awards